Mian Channu  is an administrative subdivision (tehsil) of Khanewal District in the Punjab province of Pakistan. Its capital is Mian Channu city.

Administration
The tehsil of Mian Channu is administratively subdivided into 29 union councils:

Large rural populations include 102/15.L (most populated village in Mian Channu tehsil), 96/15.L and 105/15.L (Vanjari).

References

Khanewal District
Tehsils of Punjab, Pakistan